The Azerbaijan Red Crescent Society is the largest humanitarian organization in Azerbaijan and is part of the International Red Cross and Red Crescent Movement.

Mission
The Azerbaijan Red Crescent Society is a not-for-profit, volunteer-based social service institution providing unconditional aid and service, and is a corporate body governed by state laws. Their mission is "to serve vulnerable people by mobilizing the capacity of Azerbaijan Red Crescent and the power of humanity." Its headquarters are in Baku.

History
The organization was founded under the Azerbaijan Democratic Republic on March 10, 1920, on the initiative of the then Deputy Minister of Defense, Lieutenant General Aliagha Shikhlinski and the Minister of Foreign Affairs Fatali Khan Khoyski. After Azerbaijan was occupied and annexed by Soviet Russia on April 28 that year, the Azerbaijan Red Crescent Society briefly ceased to exist when it was functioning as the Azerbaijani branch of the Russian Red Cross Society. In October 1922, the Azerbaijan Red Crescent Society (Hilal Ahmer) was re-established with the decree of the Council of People's Commissars of the Azerbaijan Soviet Socialist Republic. It functioned as a part of the Soviet League of the Red Cross and Red Crescent Societies.

In 1991 after the collapse of the Soviet Union, the Republic of Azerbaijan regained its independence and gave an independency to its national Red Crescent Society according to international standards.

See also
 International Red Cross and Red Crescent Movement
 International Committee of the Red Cross

References

External links
 Azerbaijan Red Crescent Society Official Website  

Red Cross and Red Crescent national societies
Organizations established in 1920
Organizations based in Baku
1920 establishments in Azerbaijan
Medical and health organizations based in Azerbaijan